Expedition 47 was the 47th expedition to the International Space Station.

Yuri Malenchenko, Timothy Peake and Timothy Kopra transferred from Expedition 46. Expedition 47 began upon the departure of Soyuz TMA-18M on 2 March 2016 and concluded upon the landing of Soyuz TMA-19M on 18 June 2016. The crew of Soyuz TMA-20M were then transferred to Expedition 48.

Crew

Source Spacefacts

Mission highlights
Launched on 8 April 2016, the SpaceX CRS-8 mission carried the Bigelow Expandable Activity Module to the ISS for two years of in-orbit habitat qualification.

References

External links

 NASA's Space Station Expeditions page

Expeditions to the International Space Station
2016 in spaceflight